Carlos Price is a professional rugby union player who plays for the Bay Of Plenty Steamers in the Bunnings NPC. His position of choice is First Five Eighth.

He also spent large parts of these years on an injury replacement player contract with the Hurricanes in Super Rugby. Price was a part of four pre-season games, however he never received a Super Rugby cap.

Outside of rugby, Price founded a clothing business in 2019 called One Three Eight. Price is a budding entrepreneur.

Reference list

External links
itsrugby.co.uk profile

1998 births
New Zealand rugby union players
Living people
Rugby union scrum-halves
Rugby sevens players at the 2015 Pan American Games
Wellington rugby union players
Waikato rugby union players
Bay of Plenty rugby union players